A blood ritual is any ritual that involves the intentional release of blood.

A common blood ritual is the blood brother ritual, which started in ancient Europe and Asia. Two or more people, typically male, intermingle their blood in some way. This symbolically brings the participants together into one family. This can be an unsafe practice where blood-borne pathogens are concerned; the use of safe, sterilized equipment such as a lancet can mitigate this problem.

Body piercing can also be part of a blood ritual. Though piercing does not always cause bleeding, it certainly can. Piercing has been practiced in a number of indigenous cultures throughout the world, usually as a symbolic rite of passage, a symbolic death and rebirth, an initiation, or for reasons of magical protection.

Blood rituals often involve a symbolic death and rebirth, as literal bodily birth involves bleeding. Blood is typically seen as very powerful, and sometimes as unclean. Blood sacrifice is sometimes considered by the practitioners of prayer, ritual magic, and spell casting to intensify the power of such activities. The Native American Sun Dance is usually accompanied by blood sacrifice.

Some blood rituals involve two or more parties cutting themselves or each other followed by the consumption of blood. The participants may regard the release or consumption of blood as producing energy useful as a sexual, healing, or mental stimulus. In other cases, blood is a primary component as the sacrifice, or material component for a spell. 
Blood rituals are practiced by various groups of people, including those with religious or political affiliations. Some of the rituals involving blood have been practiced for many centuries, and are still being practiced in the 21st century (Baker 1, Copeman 2, Malik 2). The Shi’ite Muslims practiced a ritual called Matam in 2002 in Britain (Malik 2).

Aztecs

The Aztecs participated in blood rituals around 500 years ago (Pendragon 1). The blood in the rituals has a symbolic meaning, depending on the group and ritual being performed. 
Around 1376 to 1521 AD, Aztecs used blood and sacrifice frequently as an offering to the Sun God (Pendragon 2). The Aztecs saw death as part of life, just like birth (Pendragon 2). They believed the gods sacrificed their own blood to create the universe, so in turn, the Aztecs offered blood to the Gods as a sort of reciprocal exchange and gift for their creations (Pendragon 2). Furthermore, the supply of ritual blood was believed to maintain plentiful fertile crops and aid in the continuation of the Aztec world. The author Jasmyne Pendragon, who has a bachelor of archaeology, stated in her Article The Purpose of Aztec Blood Rituals Part 1, that “The Aztecs lifestyles were governed by a need to supply fresh-blooded sacrificial victims to the sun god who required the hearts of men to give life to the world and assist the souls of dead warriors to the Aztecs version of heaven” (2). The rituals maintained a relationship between Aztecs and their gods (Pendragon 2). The Aztecs believed the gods would provide plentiful crops and healthy long lives as long as blood was ritually given (Pendragon 2). If blood was not sacrificed to the gods, the humans believed they would be punished and endure excessive pain “more violent than any man could ever do” (Pendragon 3).

India
Some Indians practice a political ritual voluntarily where the people donate blood as a way to remember politicians who have died (Copeman 126). The blood donation is literally a donation to people who need transfusions (Copeman 132). The participants donate at donation camps during the birthday or the anniversary of the politician's death (129). Jacob Copeman, a lecturer in social anthropology at the University of Edinburgh in Scotland, states in his article “Blood Will Have Blood: A Study in Indian Political Ritual,” that Prime Minister Indira Gandhi and Rajiv Gandhi are the two politicians who are mainly “remembered” during the blood donations (131). These two politicians were assassinated and seen as dying for India, or important individuals who “…shed their blood for the nation” (Copeman 131). According to Copeman, in a speech Indira Gandhi made in 1984, she “…strikingly associated her blood with the health of the nation. Her blood would continue to nurture the nation even after her death…” (132). The reason behind the donation is to keep life going or to give the individuals receiving the blood more time to live (Copeman 130). The reason why the politicians are involved with this is because the donors are making a connection with the dead, symbolizing the blood being donated to the blood of the politician being honored (Copeman 131). This is important because even though these people died, they are still helping preserve life, by the people of India donating blood in their honor. (Copeman 135).

Works cited
 Baker, Aryn. “Affirming a Faith Bathed in Blood.” Time. Time Inc. January 2007. Web. 7 November 2011.
 Copeman, Jacob. “Blood will have Blood: A Study in Indian Political Ritual.” Social Analysis 48 (2004): 126-48. EBSCO HOST. Web. 7 November 2011.
 Malik, Shiv. “Scars On The Backs of The Young.” New Statesman 134.4743 (2005): 22-24. Academic Search Complete. Web. 22 November 2011.
 Pendragon, Jasmyne. “The Purpose of Aztec Blood Rituals part 1.” Archnews.co.uk. Heritage Daily, 2010. Web. 7 November 2011.

References

Rituals